Darl Douglas (born 5 October 1979) is a Surinamese former professional footballer who played as a winger.

Club career
After coming through the Ajax' youth system, Douglas played professionally for RBC, Haarlem, Heracles and FC Utrecht, before moving abroad to join Portuguese side Marítimo. He returned to Holland after only a few months and played for Willem II, before finishing his career after a second spell with Heracles Almelo.

Personal life
Douglas built his own music recording studio next to his house and owned a record label, Dredda Records. In summer 2014, he moved back to Surinam with his record label. He produces under his alter ego Jah Decko.

Honours
Utrecht
Johan Cruyff Shield: 2004

References

External links
  Profile

1979 births
Living people
Sportspeople from Paramaribo
Association football wingers
Surinamese footballers
Surinamese musicians
Dutch footballers
Surinamese emigrants to the Netherlands
AFC DWS players
AFC Ajax players
RBC Roosendaal players
HFC Haarlem players
Heracles Almelo players
FC Utrecht players
C.S. Marítimo players
Willem II (football club) players
Eredivisie players
Eerste Divisie players
Primeira Liga players
Dutch expatriate footballers
Expatriate footballers in Portugal
Dutch expatriate sportspeople in Portugal
Reggae record producers